The Apostolic Vicariate of Tierradentro in the Catholic Church is located in the town of Belalcázar in the municipality of Páez, Cauca, in Colombia.

History
On 13 May 1921 Pope Benedict XV established the Prefecture Apostolic of Tierradentro from the Archdiocese of Popayán. Blessed John Paul II elevated the prefecture to an Apostolic Vicariate on 17 February 2000.

Ordinaries
Emilio Larquère, C.M. † (9 Nov 1923 – 3 Jul 1948) Died
Enrique Alejandro Vallejo Bernal, C.M. † (27 Oct 1950 – 1977) Resigned
Germán Garcia Isaza, C.M. † (21 Jul 1977 – 18 Jun 1988) Appointed, Bishop of Caldas
Jorge García Isaza, C.M. (5 May 1989 – 25 Apr 2003) Resigned
Edgar Hernando Tirado Mazo, M.X.Y. (19 Dec 2003 – 5 Jun 2015)
Óscar Augusto Múnera Ochoa (5 Jun 2015 – present)

See also
Roman Catholicism in Colombia

Sources

Apostolic vicariates
Roman Catholic dioceses in Colombia
Christian organizations established in 1921
1921 establishments in South America